Ikwerre is a Local Government Area in Rivers State, Nigeria. Its headquarters is in the town of Isiokpo.

The postal code of the area is 511.

References

Local Government Areas in Rivers State
1991 establishments in Nigeria
1990s establishments in Rivers State